"Soon I'll Be Loving You Again" is an album track issued in 1976 by singer Marvin Gaye on the I Want You album. The song's explicit nature is shown throughout the song, in which Marvin chants "I'm gonna give you some head", in other words performing oral sex on his woman. The song's erotic nature was explicit for then-1976 standards. The song would later be interpolated in a sample of a Montell Jordan song and would be covered by singer Joe for the tribute album, Marvin Is 60, in 1999.  The song was also sampled for the Jay-Z album American Gangster.

Personnel
All vocals, keyboards and synthesizers by Marvin Gaye
All other instrumentation by assorted musicians
Produced by Leon Ware and Marvin Gaye

1976 songs
Marvin Gaye songs
Songs written by Marvin Gaye
Songs written by Arthur "T-Boy" Ross
Songs written by Leon Ware
Song recordings produced by Marvin Gaye